Legislative Methods and Forms is a 372 page book written by Sir Courtenay Peregrine Ilbert and published by Oxford in 1901. "It is a description of the rivalry between common and statute law, with special reference to the details of preparation, passage and codification of statutes in Great Britain and her colonies. The book also contains a complete and interesting collection of statutory forms for bills on various subjects commonly treated by Parliament." Donald Raistrick said it is useful. James Bryce said: "It is full of valuable information and acute remarks upon modern English legislation, and brings together a mass of historical facts never previously collected." "The chapter on 'Parliament as a Legislative Machine' will be interesting to the lay reader as well as to the publicist." By 1915, the book was "well known". By 1957, it had "fallen into an unmerited neglect".

References
Ilbert, C P. Legislative Methods and Forms. Oxford. 1901. Reprinted by the Lawbook Exchange. 2008. Digitized copy from Google Books.
Digitized copies      from Internet Archive. 

Law books
1901 non-fiction books